Family secret or family secrets can also refer to:

 Family secret, a secret within a family
 Family Secrets (novel), a novel by Norma Klein
 "Family Secret", a song by Alannah Myles from her 1995 album A-lan-nah
 Family Secrets (game show), an NBC daytime game show
 The Family Secret (1924 film), a 1924 silent film 
 The Family Secret (1951 film), a 1951 movie starring John Derek and Lee J. Cobb
 Family Secrets (1984 film), a television movie starring Stefanie Powers
 A Family Secret (film), a 2006 Canadian film starring Ginette Reno
 A Family Secret (Upstairs, Downstairs)
 Family Secrets (Canadian TV series), a 2003 documentary series created and produced by Maureen Judge
 Family Secrets (Turkish TV series), a 2016 series produced by Faruk Turgut
 Family Secret (TV series), a South Korea television series
 "The Family Secret", an episode of TV series In the Heat of the Night
 The Ladies' Gallery: A Memoir of Family Secrets
 Operation Family Secrets